Maung Nyein Chan (15 June 1948 – 29 June 2010) was a Burmese comic book artist best known for a comic book series featuring a character named Sai Baydar. Throughout his career, he authored over 220 comic books and directed several films.

He was born Nyunt Tin in Taungoo, Burma to parents Maung Pu and Mya Yin. He attended the State School of Fine Art and began his career at Mandalay’s Hantharwaddy newspaper. He adopted the pen name "Maung Nyein Chan" during the publication of his first comic book, Yadana Pond.

Maung Nyein Chan died  on 29 June 2010 of a heart attack at the North Okkalapa Hospital.

Notes

References

Burmese artists
People from Bago Region
1948 births
2010 deaths